Marco Brouwers (born 10 March 1958) is a Dutch volleyball player. He competed in the men's tournament at the 1988 Summer Olympics.

References

1958 births
Living people
Dutch men's volleyball players
Olympic volleyball players of the Netherlands
Volleyball players at the 1988 Summer Olympics
Sportspeople from Amsterdam